Yasfaadh Habeeb (born 9 September 1992), known as Mulakey, is a Maldivian professional footballer who plays as an attacking midfielder  for Da Grande Sports Club.

Club career
Yasfaadh started his career playing for the Third Division side BG Sports Club in 2011. He played a vital role in their back-to-back promotions – gaining promotion to Second Division in 2011 and first division in 2012, before moving to Club Eagles in 2013.

On 28 February 2013, Yasfaadh made his official debut for Eagles in their season opener, also contributing an assist for Adam Shahir in the 4–2 win against his former club BG Sports. He scored his first goal for the club on 9 May 2013, in the 4–0 win against Club All Youth Linkage in Dhivehi League.

On 14 December 2015, Ysafaadh joined Maziya on a 2 year deal. He made his debut on 24 February 2016, in the 5–2 loss against Mohun Bagan, making his first appearance in AFC Cup.

On 21 February 2019, the newly promoted side Da Grande Sports Club announced the signing of Yasfaadh.

International career
Yasfaadh represented Maldives at the 2014 Asian Games.

On 7 June 2016, Yasfaadh made his debut for the Maldives national team in the Asian Cup qualifying play-off round second leg fixture against Yemen at the Grand Hamad Stadium where they lost by 2–0.

Honours

Club
BG Sports Club
Third Division: Runner-up 2011
Second Division: 2012

Club Eagles 
FA Cup: Third 2013
President's Cup: Runner-up 2014

Maziya
Dhivehi Premier League: 2016
Malé League: 2017
FA Cup: Third 2017
FA Charity Shield: 2016, 2017

References

External links
 
 

1992 births
Living people
Maldivian footballers
Association football midfielders
Maldives international footballers
Footballers at the 2014 Asian Games
Asian Games competitors for the Maldives
Club Eagles players
Da Grande Sports Club players